Boogie Motel is the eighth studio album by rock band Foghat, released in 1979. It was recorded at the Boogie Motel Studios in Port Jefferson, NY, and was certified gold in the US. The cover art is by Jim Baikie.

"Third Time Lucky (First Time I Was a Fool)" was included on The Best of Foghat (1985). "Somebody's Been Sleepin' in My Bed" was included on The Best of Foghat - Volume II (1992).

Track listing
All tracks by Dave Peverett, except where noted.

"Somebody's Been Sleepin' in My Bed" (General Johnson, Greg Perry, Angelo Bond) – 3:50
"Third Time Lucky (First Time I Was a Fool)" – 4:12
"Comin' Down with Love" – 5:23
"Paradise Alley" – 5:37
"Boogie Motel" (Rod Price, Peverett) – 7:20
"Love in Motion" – 4:30
"Nervous Release" – 5:53

Personnel
Jimmy Ambrosio – accordion
Jim Baikie – cover art
David Berman – engineer
Tony Berman – engineer
Bob Coffee – assistant engineer
Colin Earl – keyboards
Roger Earl – drums
Bob Ludwig – mastering
Craig MacGregor – bass guitar
Tony Outeda – producer, management
Lonesome Dave Peverett – electric and acoustic guitar, lead vocals
Rod Price – dobro, guitar, vocals, slide guitar
Alto Reed – saxophone

Charts

References

1979 albums
Foghat albums
Bearsville Records albums